Liberation Route Europe is an international remembrance trail that connects the main regions along the advance of the Western Allied Forces toward the liberation of Europe and final stage of the Second World War. The route started in 2008 as a Dutch regional initiative in the Arnhem-Nijmegen area and then developed into a transnational route that was officially inaugurated in Arromanches on June 6, 2014, during the Normandy D-day commemorations. The route goes from Southern England (commemorating the early years of the war) through France, Belgium, Luxembourg, the Netherlands to Berlin in Germany, then extends to the Czech Republic and Poland. The southern route starts in Italy. As a form of remembrance tourism, LRE aims to unfold these Allied offensives of 1944 and 1945 in one narrative combining the different perspectives and points of view. By combining locations with personal stories of people who fought and suffered there, it gives visitors the opportunity to follow the Allied march and visit significant sites from war cemeteries to museums and monuments but also events and commemorations. In April 2019, Liberation Route Europe became a certified Cultural Route of the Council of Europe.

The Route

Great Britain 
After the fall of France in 1940 and their own defeat on the continent, The Royal Air Force (RAF) defended their island. The action became known as the Battle of Britain. The route starts in London and goes through Kent (from where the Dunkirk evacuation was controlled) and Hampshire (where Operation Overlord, the D-Day landing, was planned and prepared).

Important remembrance sites
 Imperial War Museum
 Churchill War Rooms
 Dungeness
 Dover Castle
 D-Day Museum Portsmouth
 Southwick House

France

Normandy 

During Operation Overlord, the largest amphibious assault in history, Allied forces landed on five beaches along an  stretch of Normandy coast on D-Day. This operation marked the start of the liberation of Western Europe. The route here comprises the five landing beaches: Omaha Beach (from Sainte-Honorine-des-Pertes to Vierville-sur-Mer), Utah Beach (Sainte-Marie-du-Mont), Gold Beach (between Port-en-Bessin and La Rivière), Juno Beach (from Courseulles to Saint-Aubin-sur-Mer), Sword Beach (from Ouistreham to Saint-Aubin-sur-Mer), along with Pointe du Hoc (Criqueville-en-Bessin) and Ranville (British Airlandings) or Longues-sur-Mer (German Battery).

The following Battle of Normandy resulted not only in the deaths of tens of thousands of soldiers, but also many French civilians. Almost all of the larger cities in the region were badly damaged.

Important remembrance sites

 Museums
 Liberation Museum Cherbourg
 Juno Beach Centre
 D-Day Museum Arromanches
 Mémorial de Caen
 Memorial Pegasus
 Merville Battery Museum
 'The Grand Bunker' Atlantikwall Museum
 Airborne Museum - Sainte-Mère-Eglise
 Crisbecq Battery Museum
 Memorial of Montormel
 Memorial Museum of the Battle of Normandy - Bayeux
 Utah Beach D-Day Museum
 Cemeteries
 Bayeux British Military Cemetery
 Bény-sur-Mer Canadian Cemetery
 La Cambe German Military Cemetery
 Normandy American Cemetery
 Monument
 La Fière Bridge and Iron Mike Monument

Paris 

An uprising of the population against the Germans on August 19 forced the Allies to send troops to liberate Paris, although it was not a priority. The French 2nd Armoured Division entered Paris on the evening of August 24. The capitulation was signed on the Île de la Cité, German troops surrendered at the Montparnasse train station. Two days later a triumphal parade, led by General Charles de Gaulle, was held on the Champs-Elysées.

Important remembrance sites
 Historial Charles de Gaulle
 Memorial General Leclerc de Hauteclocque and the Liberation of Paris—Jean Moulin Museum
 Army Museum—Invalides
 Order of Liberation Museum

Belgium

Ardennes 
The Battle of the Bulge was the last major German offensive campaign launched through the densely forested Ardennes region. They were eventually pushed back by the Allied forces to the Siegfried Line.

Important remembrance sites
 Bastogne War Museum
 Mardasson Memorial
 Bastogne Barracks
 Battle of the Bulge Museum—La Roche-en-Ardenne
 Henri Chapelle American Cemetery

Brussels 
Brussels was liberated on September 3 by the Guards Armoured Division of General Allan Adair including the Belgian 'Piron brigade'.

Important remembrance sites
 Royal Museum of the Armed Forces and Military History
 Kazerne Dossin
 Fort Breendonk

Luxembourg 
Luxembourg was in the vicinity of the Battle of the Bulge offensive and had to wait until 12 February 1945 before being completely liberated.

Important remembrance sites
 Museum of Military History—Diekirch
 Luxembourg American Cemetery

The Netherlands 
The Dutch section of Liberation Route Europe is concentrated in the provinces of Gelderland, North-Brabant, Overijssel, Zeeland and Limburg. In these provinces a large network of 176 'audiospots' has been developed to combine historical sites and personal stories.

Gelderland 
The main historical places on the route here are Arnhem (Battle of Arnhem) Nijmegen (Operation Market Garden), Groesbeek (Operation Veritable), Wageningen (German capitulation), Oosterbeek (Operation Market Garden), Otterlo (Liberation of the East) and Lent (Men's Island).

Important remembrance sites
 Museums
 Airborne Museum Hartenstein
 National Liberation Museum 1944–1945
 Museum De Casteelse Poort
 Cemeteries
 Airborne War Cemetery Arnhem-Oosterbeek
 Canadian War Cemetery Groesbeek
 Jonkerbos War Cemetery Nijmegen
 Loenen Field of Honour
 Memorial for the mass grave Huissen
 Audiospots: 76

North-Brabant 

Important remembrance sites
 Museums
 Overloon War Museum
 General Maczek Museum Breda
 Camp Vught National Memorial
 Museum Wings of Liberation
 Cemeteries
 Bergen op Zoom Canadian War Cemetery
 Overloon War Cemetery
 Audiospots: 61

Overijssel 

Important remembrance sites
 Cemeteries
 Holten Canadian War Cemetery
 Audiospots: 7

Zeeland 

Important remembrance sites
 Museums
 Liberation Museum Zeeland
 Roertriangle Museum
 Cemeteries
 Flushing Commonwealth War Cemetery
 Audiospots: 10

Limburg 

Important remembrance sites
 Museums
 Eyewitness Museum
 Cemeteries
 Netherlands American Cemetery—Margraten
 Ysselsteyn German War Cemetery
 British Military Cemetery Mook
 Brunssum War Cemetery
 Nederweert British War Cemetery
 Audiospots: 22

Germany

North Rhine-Westphalia 
During the autumn and winter of 1944–45, the longest battle of the Second World War on German soil took place in the Hürtgen Forest. With this battle, which ended in an Allied victory, the war returned to Germany and opened the road to Berlin.

Seven 'audiospots' have been installed in the region.

Important remembrance sites
 Museums
 Museum Hürtgenwald 1944—Vossenack
 Field Hospital Bunker Simonskall
 Vogelsang International Place
 Cemeteries
 Halbe Forest Cemetery
 Hürtgen War Cemetery
 Vossenack German Cemetery
 Reichswald Forest British War Cemetery—Kleve
 Audiospots: 7

Berlin 
Berlin is the endpoint of the route. The Battle of Berlin was one of the last battles of the Second World War in Europe. Many soldiers died in widespread house-to-house fighting where Soviet soldiers faced desperate German resistance. On May 2, 1945, the Berlin garrison surrendered to the Soviet army. The unconditional surrender of Germany was signed on the 8th.

Important remembrance sites
 Museums
 Allied Museum
 German-Russian Museum
 Cecilienhof Palace
 Topography of Terror
 Monuments
 Kaiser Wilhelm Memorial Church
 Reichstag
 Seelow Heights Memorial
 Soviet War Memorial Tiergarten
 Soviet War Memorial Treptow Park
 Friedrichstraße Railway Bunker
 Memorial for the Murdered Jews of Europe
 Cemeteries
 Soviet-Russian War Cemetery Simmerath-Rurberg

Poland

Gdańsk 
On the 1st of September 1939, the battleship Schleswig-Holstein opened fire on the Westerplatte in Gdańsk. This is regarded as the first shots of the Second World War. After the war, Gdansk would become an important symbol of Polish resistance.

Important remembrance sites
 Museums
Polish Post Museum
Stutthof Museum
European Solidarity Centre
 Monuments
 Monument of the Coast Defenders
 Cemeteries
 The Cemetery of the Defenders of Westerplatte

Czech Republic

Pilsen 
Pilsen is the capital city of the Czech Republic's western region of Bohemia. In May 1945, the US Third Army led by George S. Patton entered Pilsen to liberate the Czech people from six years of occupation by Nazi Germany. The locals remember these events today and they remain immensely grateful to the US Army.

Important remembrance sites
 
 16th Armored Division Memorial
 Thank You America Memorial

Italy 
The Liberation Route Europe in Italy connects important remembrance sites connected to the landing in Sicily, the Gustav Line defense, the Battle of Montecassino, the landing in Anzio, the Gothic Line defense.

The Liberation Route Europe Foundation 
The Liberation Route Europe is developed and managed by the Liberation Route Europe Foundation with offices in Utrecht and Brussels. Its purpose is to bring together all of the institutions related to World War II—museums, universities, regional and national governments, tourism authorities, veterans associations, war graves commissions and so on.)—and to coordinate their efforts at an international level.

Martin Schulz, former President of the European Parliament, serves as the patron of the Liberation Route Europe Foundation.

See also 
 History of World War II

External links 
 Official website

References 

Aftermath of World War II
Trails